Miguel Uriel van Assen (born 30 July 1997) is a Surinamese athlete specializing in the triple jump. He won the gold medal at the 2017 South American Championships. In addition, he won multiple medals in age-group competitions, including the gold at the 2014 Summer Youth Olympic Games.

His personal best in the event is 16.94 metres set in Asunción in 2017. This is the current national record.

International competitions

1Out of competition performance
2No mark in the final

Personal bests
High jump – 2.03 (Nassau 2013)
Long jump – 7.66 (+0.3 m/s, St. Georges 2016)
Triple jump – 16.94 (+2.0 m/s, Asunción 2017) national record

References

 

1997 births
Living people
Surinamese male triple jumpers
Athletes (track and field) at the 2014 Summer Youth Olympics
Athletes (track and field) at the 2015 Pan American Games
Pan American Games competitors for Suriname
World Athletics Championships athletes for Suriname
Central American and Caribbean Games bronze medalists for Suriname
Competitors at the 2018 Central American and Caribbean Games
South American Games gold medalists for Suriname
South American Games medalists in athletics
Competitors at the 2014 South American Games
Athletes (track and field) at the 2018 South American Games
Youth Olympic gold medalists for Suriname
Central American and Caribbean Games medalists in athletics
Youth Olympic gold medalists in athletics (track and field)
South American Games gold medalists in athletics
Islamic Solidarity Games medalists in athletics
21st-century Surinamese people